Krishan Dev Sethi (1 January 1928 – 28 January 2021) was the General secretary of Democratic Conference Jammu and Kashmir and was the last member of J&K's constituent assembly.

Sethi was not only a well known leader in Jammu, where he resided but also very popular across the LOC in Azad Jammu & Kashmir. He was an ardent supporter of an independent Kashmir and fought for independence since the 1950s.

Death
Sethi died at his Jammu residence on 28 January 2021. He was the last surviving member of constituent assembly of Jammu and Kashmir.

References

External links
 Sethi's interview with Kashmir affairs

Kashmiri people
2021 deaths
1928 births